Bayraktar may refer to:

Bayraktar (surname)
Bayraktar, Bayburt, a village in Turkey
Bayraktar UAV, a brand of Turkish drone 
Bayraktar (song), Ukraine, 2022, about the UAV in the Russian invasion
Bayraktar-class tank landing ship, Turkish Navy

See also
Alemdar